Eupithecia regulella is a moth in the family Geometridae. It is found in Peru.

The forewings are olive ochreous, crossed by a regular series of blackish grey lines. The hindwings are similar to the forewings.

References

Moths described in 1907
regulella
Moths of South America